The following is a list of people who have served as mayors of the city of Las Vegas in the U.S state of Nevada .

List of mayors of Las Vegas

See also
 Las Vegas history and timeline

References

External links
 City of Las Vegas Official Website

Las Vegas, Nevada